The Qing dynasty of China ruled over the Mongolian Plateau, including Inner Mongolia and Outer Mongolia. Both regions, however, were separately administered within the empire.

The estate of Jebtsundamba Khutugtu, the Great  (from Mongolian , disciple) in 1723, became independent from the four  in the sense that its subjects were exempt from most taxes and corvees. The  did not—except the three Darkhad  in Khövsgöl—control territory. Rather, its subjects mostly lived among the general population. Similar  existed for other high lamas.

Direct control
The direct-controlled Mongols were banners controlled by provinces, generals and ambasa. The following regions were directly controlled by the Manchu:

 Chakhar (Zhili Province)
 Dariganga - Qing emperor's pasture, where the best horses from both Inner and Outer Mongolia were collected and mastered by the Dariganga tribe. It was controlled from Kalgan. Today's location is Dariganga , Sukhbaatar province, Mongolia.
 Guihua Town Tümed (Shanxi)
 Barga (Heilongjiang)
 Tannu Uriankhai 5 banners and 46 or 47  (Governor general of Uliastai)
 Myanghad Banner, Zakhchin Banner and Ööld Banner (Khovd)
 Altai Uriankhai and Altai Nuur Uriankhai (Khovd)
 Damxung Mongolians (Tibet)

Inner Mongolia

Inner Mongolia's original 24  were replaced by 49 banners (s) that would later be organized into six leagues (assemblies). The eight Chakhar banners and the two Tümed banners around Guihua were directly administered by the Manchu.
Jirim League
Khorchin 6 banners
Jalaid 1 banner
Dörbet 1 banner
Gorlos 1 banner
Josotu League
Kharchin 3 banners
 Kharchin Right Banner
 Kharchin Middle Banner
 Kharchin Left Banner
Tümed 2 banners
Juu Uda League
Aokhan 1 banner
Naiman 1 banner
Baarin 2 banners
Jarud 2 banners
Ar Khorchin 2 banners
Onginuud 1 banner
Kesigten 1 banner
Züün Khalkha 1 banner
Xilin Gol League
Üzemchin 2 banners
Khuuchid 2 banners
Sünid 2 banners
Abga 2 banners
Abganar 2 banners
Ulanqab League
Dörben Khüükhed 1 banner
Muu Myangan 1 banner
Urad 3 banners
Baruun Khalkha 1 banner
Ihe Juu League
Ordos Mongols 7 banners

Outer Mongolia (Khalkha)

The Khalkha  were preserved—with the notable exception of the establishment of Sain Noyan  in 1725. The  were divided into banners - whose number increased from originally eight eventually to 86—and further into . A military governor was installed in Uliastai, and two civil governors in Khüree and in Kobdo.

Ochirbatu Tüshiyetu Khan aimag 20 banners
Gobi Tüshiye Gong
Darhan Chin Wang 
Zorigtu Wang 
Gobi Mergen Wang 
Erdeni Daichin Wang 
Daichin Beise 
Sain Noyan  24 banners
Sain Noyan 22 banners
Ööld Banner
Ööld Front Banner
Maha Samadhi Secen Khan  23 banners
Borjigin Secen Wang 
Achitu Wang 
Secen Chin Wang 
Sang Beise 
Höbchi yin Jinong Wang 
Hurtsa Wang 
Dalai Darhan Beile
Zasagtu Khan  19 banners
 Erdeni Bishireltu Zasagtu Khan 
 Akhai Beile 
 Dalai Gong 
 Mergen Gong 
 Degüregchi Wang 
 Tsogtoi Beise 
 Chin Achit Wang 
 Zorigtu Wang 
 Jilhanza Hutuhtu 
 Ilagugsan Hutuhtu 
 Sartaul Secen Hang 
 Bagatur Wang 
 Erdeni Beise 
 Darhan Beile 
 Daichin Wang 
 Süjigtu Gong 
 Üizen Beise 
 Nomun Khan Hutuhtu 
 Ilden Gong 
 Bishireltu Gong 
 Itgemjitu Beile 
 Yosotu Beise 
 Jinong Wang

Tannu Uriankhai 
Tannu Banner
Salajik Banner
Tojin Banner
Khövsgöl Nuur Banner
Ar Shirkhten Uriankhai 1 
Övör Shirkhten Uriankhai 1 
Khemchik Banner
Uliastai General (Amban) 25 
Zasagtu Khan 5 
Sain Noyan Hošo Prince 13 
Jebtsundamba Khutugtu’s Darkhad Shabinar 5 

Western Hetao Mongolia

Alasha Ööled Banner (modern-day Alxa left and right banners in Alxa League, Inner Mongolia)
Ejine Torghuud Banner (modern-day Ejina banner in Alxa League, Inner Mongolia)

Other Mongolian banners

Kobdo
Thirty :

 Batu Irugertu Tögs Khülug Dalai Khan 
 Batu Irugertu Tögs Khülug Dalai Khan 
 Kobdo Taiachin 
 Daichin Zasag 
 Dalai Gong 
 Jinong Zasag 
 Erdeni Zasag 
 Erhe Zasag 
 Bagatur Zasag 
 Mergen Zasag 
 Iltei Zasag 
 Secen Zasag 
 Hurtsa Gong 
 Saragul Gong 
 Ünen Zorigtu Khan 
 Altai Uriankhai 7 banners
 Daichin Gong Banner
 Tusalagchi Gong Banner
 Torghuud, Khoshuud 3 banners
 Zakhchin Örnö, Dorno Banner
 Hovd Tümed Tariachin Banner

Qinghai Mongols
 Khoshuud 21 banners
 Choros 2 banners
Choros North Middle Banner
Choros South Right Wing First Banner
 Khoyid 1 banner
Khoyid South Banner
 Torghuud 4 banners
Torghuud West Banner
Torghuud South Front Banner
Torghuud South Middle Banner
Torghuud South Rear Banner
 Khalkha 1 banner
Khalkha South Right Banner

Xinjiang
13 banners (in modern-day Xinjiang)

References

Mongolia under Qing rule
Mongolia